Army College of Medical Sciences (also known as ACMS New Delhi) is an Indian medical college affiliated with Guru Gobind Singh Indraprastha University. It is supported by Army Welfare Education Society (AWES) of Indian Army for wards of serving and retired personnel of the Indian Army.
It is one of the most prestigious college of Indian Army and is amongst top five emerging medical colleges of India . It is situated near Base Hospital Delhi Cantt, New Delhi. The annual intake of students to this college is 100.

Status 
It is an army aided college run by Indian army and is among the top 25 medical colleges in India  https://www.indiatoday.in/bestcolleges/2018/ranks/1792403?page=24 . The college was opened in 2008 for its first batch of MBBS students.the teaching hospital affiliated to the college is base hospital which is run by the armed forces.

1) 2008 - Alpha Batch
2) 2009 - Bravo Batch
3) 2010 - Charlie Batch
4) 2013 - Delta Batch
5) 2014 - Echo Batch
6) 2015 - Foxtrot Batch
7) 2016 - Golf Batch
8) 2017 - Hotel Batch
9) 2018 - India Batch
10) 2019 - Juliet Batch
11) 2020 - Kilo Batch

Entrance exam 

NEET UG conducted by National Testing Agency (NTA).
Merit list is prepared by the NTA and the same is sent to University, which carries out counselling, and students are admitted.

Eligibility 

 Wards of Army person
 He or she should have cleared the higher senior secondary examination from a recognized board or university (or equivalent) in the first attempt with 50 percent PCB and English as compulsory subjects.

Selection process 

Once selected in the merit list, students are invited for the counselling processing and admissions are done.
On completion of the course, students can join the armed forces or pursue civil practice.

See also
Education in India
Literacy in India
List of institutions of higher education in Delhi

References

External links
Official College Website
AdmissionFever.com

Medical colleges in Delhi